Tibor Czorba (1906 in Szepesváralja – September 5, 1985 in Warsaw) was a Hungarian artist.

In 1929 he completed art school in Budapest and in 1938 at PIRR in Warsaw, Poland.  In 1944 he earned a doctorate in philosophy at the University of Budapest.

Czorba traveled a lot through France, Belgium, United Kingdom, Bulgaria, and the former Czechoslovakia.  He published many works in the field of history and literature in the form of textbooks and dictionaries.  His art is found at the Gallery of Modern Art in Krakow, Poland, as well as Washington DC, New York City, and many other Hungarian galleries.

References

1906 births
1985 deaths
20th-century Hungarian painters
Hungarian male painters
20th-century Hungarian male artists